USS Schenck (DD-159) was a  in the United States Navy during World War II. She was named for Rear Admiral James F. Schenck, USN (1807–1882).

Construction and commissioning
Schenck was laid down by the New York Shipbuilding Corporation at Camden in New Jersey on 26 March 1918, launched on 23 April 1919, sponsored by Miss Mary Janet Earle and commissioned on 30 October 1919.

Service history
Schenck was attached to the U.S. Atlantic Fleet and, after shakedown, operated between New York and Chesapeake Bay. Between July and September 1920, she patrolled off the east coast of Mexico; and, in early 1921, she participated in fleet exercises in the Caribbean Sea. Her crew was reduced to 50% of her authorized complement at Charleston, South Carolina, on 7 November 1921; and she was decommissioned at Philadelphia on 9 June 1922.

Schenck was recommissioned on 1 May 1930, and trained reservists during the summer. In January 1931, she joined the fleet in the Caribbean for Fleet Problem XII and, the following year, also participated in Fleet Problem XIII off Hawaii. Due to the increased tension in the Far East resulting from Japanese military action in Manchuria and at Shanghai, China, she remained in the Pacific Ocean with the Scouting Fleet until June 1932. Schenck again returned to the Pacific in February 1933 for Fleet Problem XIV and remained there until April 1934, when she re-entered the Caribbean for more fleet exercises. Then, with intervening periods of overhaul and rotating reserve at Norfolk, Virginia Schenck trained naval reservists and Naval Academy midshipmen in cruises along the Atlantic and Gulf coasts from May 1935 until the outbreak of war in Europe.

World War II
On 9 September 1939, Schenck commenced Neutrality Patrol duty off the east coast; and, after overhaul, moved to Key West for further patrols. During the summer of 1940, she made two midshipman cruises from Annapolis. She then carried out more patrols in the Caribbean, between 22 August and 8 December 1940, between 15 January and 18 March 1941, and between 27 June and 14 July 1941. Training and repairs filled intervals between her patrols.

On 15 September 1941, Schenck arrived at Naval Station Argentia, Newfoundland, for duty escorting convoys carrying vital materiel to England. She left Argentia with her first convoy on 29 September; and when the United States entered World War II, the destroyer had escorted two convoys to a guarded rendezvous with British escorts off Iceland and escorted a ship back to Argentia. She remained on the convoy route between Argentia and Iceland until April 1943, fighting heavy weather and German submarines. During two long periods, 19 February to 9 May 1942 and 18 August 1942 to 23 March 1943, she was based in Iceland escorting convoys in and out of Icelandic ports. Twice her convoy was attacked; on 15 August 1942, and from 6 to 8 February 1943. The weather also took its toll, frequently causing minor structural damage to the old ship; and, on 13 March 1943, a gale caused her to drag anchor and collide with SS Exterminator in an Icelandic port. Schenck was then sent to Boston for repairs.

North Atlantic convoys escorted

Mid-Atlantic
Reassigned to more southerly routes, Schenck resumed convoy escort duties on 28 April 1943, and, during the summer, escorted convoys between east coast ports, the Caribbean, and North Africa. She returned to Chesapeake Bay with a convoy on 26 October 1943, and, after overhaul and training, joined a hunter-killer group built around the escort carrier . The group conducted patrols against enemy submarines near the Azores between 24 November 1943 and 2 January 1944. The high point of Schenck war service came on 24 December 1943, when the group located a concentration of U-boats. Almost immediately, another submarine sank Schencks squadronmate, . Schenck continued her ASW operations and was later commended by the task group commander for her role in preventing a concentrated wolf pack attack on Card; for her continued aggressive action after the sinking of Leary, despite having only fourteen depth charges left; and for her skillful rescue of Learys survivors.

In February and March 1944, Schenck made one more round-trip convoy voyage from the east coast to Casablanca, and, between 17 April and 10 June, she escorted  on troop-carrying voyages along the east coast. Between 10 July and 29 August, she provided training services for submarines at Bermuda and then entered the Brooklyn Navy Yard where she was stripped of her armament. Subsequently, she was assigned for duty under Commander, Air Force, Atlantic Fleet, as a torpedo target ship for aircraft. Reclassified AG-82 effective 25 September 1944, she provided target services for student pilots off Quonset Point, Rhode Island, until the end of the war. This service is not without its dangers. The ship was twice holed by exercise torpedoes which failed to run at set depth and once struck by a low-flying aircraft.

Schenck was decommissioned at the Boston Naval Shipyard on 17 May 1946, stricken from the Naval Vessel Register on 5 June 1946 and sold for scrap to the Boston Metals Company at Baltimore in Maryland on 25 November 1946.

Awards
Schenck received one battle star for her World War II service.

References

Bibliography

External links
 NavSource.org DD-159

 

Wickes-class destroyers
World War II destroyers of the United States
World War II auxiliary ships of the United States
Ships built by New York Shipbuilding Corporation
1919 ships